The 2021–22 Fresno State Bulldogs men's basketball team represents California State University, Fresno in the 2021–22 NCAA Division I men's basketball season. The Bulldogs 
are led by fourth-year head coach Justin Hutson and play their home games at the Save Mart Center as members of the Mountain West Conference.

Previous season
In a season limited due to the ongoing COVID-19 pandemic, the Bulldogs finished the 2020–21 season 12–12, 9–11 in Mountain West play to finish in sixth place. They defeated New Mexico in the first round of the Mountain West tournament before losing to Colorado State in the quarterfinals.

Offseason

Departures

Incoming transfers

Recruiting classes

2021 recruiting class

2022 Recruiting class

Roster

Schedule and results

|-
!colspan=12 style=| Exhibition

|-
!colspan=12 style=| Non-conference regular season

|-
!colspan=12 style=| Mountain West regular season

|-
!colspan=12 style=| Mountain West tournament

|-
!colspan=12 style=| The Basketball Classic

Source

References

Fresno State Bulldogs men's basketball seasons
Fresno State
Fresno State
The Basketball Classic championship seasons
Fresno State
Fresno State